Seyfetler  is a village in Zonguldak District, Zonguldak Province, Turkey.

References

Villages in Zonguldak Central District